Reece George Cole (born 17 February 1998) is an English professional footballer who plays as a central midfielder for  club Hayes & Yeading United. He is a graduate of the Brentford academy and made one senior appearance for the club before his release in 2020. Following spells with Queens Park Rangers U23 and Dunfermline Athletic, he dropped into non-League football in 2022.

Career

Brentford 
Cole began his youth career in the Hayes & Yeading United youth system, before joining Brentford at age 14. He was a part of the U15 team which emerged victorious in the Junior category at the 2012 Milk Cup. Cole made 8 appearances for the U18 team before signing a scholarship deal at the end of the 2013–14 season. He made 32 appearances and scored seven goals during his two-year scholarship and increasingly became part of the Development Squad during the 2015–16 season, progressing sufficiently to sign a professional contract in February 2016. Cole was an unused substitute for a number of late-season first team matches in April 2016.

Whilst a regular for the B team, Cole received sporadic calls into the first team squad during the 2016–17 season, before making his senior debut as a late substitute for Nico Yennaris in a 3–2 victory over Nottingham Forest on 7 March 2017. One month later, he signed a new three-year contract. Cole won further attention with long-range goals in pre-season friendly wins over Aldershot Town and Oxford United in July 2017, before departing to join League Two club Newport County on loan until January 2018. He made his debut versus Coventry City 9 days later and scored the first senior goal of his career with the only goal of the game. Cole made four further appearances and returned to Brentford in late September 2017 after suffering a knee injury. He returned to match play with the B team in December, but did not win any further calls into the first team squad before the end of the season.

Cole spent much of the remainder of his contract away on loan with EFL, National League and Scottish Championship clubs Yeovil Town, Maidenhead United, Macclesfield Town and Partick Thistle. He gained significant game time at the latter two clubs, in particular scoring four goals in a five-match spell during November 2019, which saw him win the Partick Thistle Player of the Month award. Cole was released by Brentford in June 2020.

Queens Park Rangers
On 15 March 2021, Cole signed a short-term contract with the U23 team at Championship club Queens Park Rangers on a free transfer. He failed to win a call into the first team squad before the end of the season and was released when his contract expired.

Dunfermline Athletic 
On 20 July 2021, Cole signed a one-year contract with Scottish Championship club Dunfermline Athletic on a free transfer. After featuring predominantly as a substitute during the early months of the season, Cole undertook extra fitness training at the Joe Cardle Academy. On his 12th and final appearance of a 2021–22 season which culminated in relegation to the Scottish League One, Cole scored his only goal for the club in a 2–1 victory over Ayr United on 16 April 2022. He was released at the end of the season.

Non-League football 
Cole began the 2022–23 season with Isthmian League South Central Division club Chertsey Town. He scored three goals in his first seven appearances for the club, before departing to rejoin Southern League Premier Division South club Hayes & Yeading United in October 2022.

Personal life 
Cole attended Chalfonts Community College.

Career statistics

Honours 

 Partick Thistle Player of the Month: November 2019

References

External links 
 
 Reece Cole at hyufc.com

1998 births
Living people
English footballers
Association football midfielders
Footballers from Hillingdon
Brentford F.C. players
Newport County A.F.C. players
Yeovil Town F.C. players
Maidenhead United F.C. players
English Football League players
National League (English football) players
Macclesfield Town F.C. players
Partick Thistle F.C. players
Queens Park Rangers F.C. players
Dunfermline Athletic F.C. players
Scottish Professional Football League players
Chertsey Town F.C. players
Isthmian League players
Hayes & Yeading United F.C. players
Southern Football League players